Gerardo José Mendoza (3 January 1989 – 18 July 2019) was a Venezuelan footballer who played as a midfielder. He was killed in a robbery on his home in Trujillo, Venezuela, in 2019.

Career statistics

Club

Notes

References

1989 births
2019 deaths
Venezuelan footballers
Association football midfielders
Trujillanos FC players
Portuguesa F.C. players
Yaracuyanos FC players
Venezuelan Primera División players
Venezuelan murder victims
People murdered in Venezuela
2019 murders in Venezuela
People from Valera
21st-century Venezuelan people